Ratmir Vilyevich Timashev (born 26 June 1966) is a Russian IT entrepreneur, founder and former CEO of Veeam Software. He also owns ABRT Venture Fund, which invests in early stage IT startup companies. He has been listed in The Top 25 Innovators of the Year by CRN Magazine and won a Silver Stevie Award for Executive of the Year — Computer Services.

Early life and education
Ratmir Timashev was born in Ufa, Russian SFSR, in 1966. He earned two master's degrees in Physics from Moscow Institute of Physics and Technology (in 1990) and in Chemical Physics from the Ohio State University (in 1996).

Career
In 1995, while still a graduate student at OSU, he started his first business with his college roommate, Andrei Baronov. The first business established by Timashev was an internet e-commerce start-up. With his partner, Baronov, he built an online store to sell computer parts. Later in 1996, the two partners created several tools for Windows NT administrators and these tools' sales soon exceeded the revenue from the computer parts' sales, which led Timashev to start a new company, Aelita Software. Started in 1997, Aelita Software, was focused on Windows Server systems management and monitoring software. Over the next eight years, Aelita grew to $30 million in sales. At the beginning of 2004, the company was sold to its prime competitor, Quest Software, for about $115 million. Timashev had become a General Manager at Quest Software responsible for the new Windows Enterprise Management business unit. He left Quest Software at the beginning of 2005.

In late 2005, Timashev realized the potential of virtualization technologies. He decided to do something similar to what he and Baronov had done for Windows NT, but for the virtual environment instead. In 2006, Timashev started a new company that he named Veeam Software. The first Veeam products were designed for managing and monitoring the VMware ESX virtualization platform. In 2008 the company released a backup tool called Veeam Backup & Replication. The tool soon became Veeam's flagship product and helped the company enter the backup market.

By the end of 2015, Veeam Software employed more than 1,950 people worldwide and reported $474 million in revenue.

In 2011, Forbes magazine included Timashev among the top 30 IT businessmen in Russia. In 2016 Kommersant listed him in the top 100 Russian Internet millionaires. In 2018, Forbes had him as 116th among the 200 richest businessmen in Russia with a fortune of $950 million.

In 2023, Timashev pledged $110 million to Ohio State University to establish the Center for Software Innovation.

Venture activities
Since 2004, Timashev and Baronov started investing in information technology companies that develop internet and software products. They established ABRT Venture Fund (the name ABRT came from the first letters of the founders’ names: Andrei Baronov and Ratmir Timashev). The company mainly invests in eastern and central European-based companies. The fund invests in startup companies, provides its own specialists to enable sales, marketing and other necessary activities, and then exits on IPO or a company’s sale stage.

References

1966 births
Living people
21st-century American businesspeople
American people of Russian descent
American technology company founders
Chief executives in the technology industry
Moscow Institute of Physics and Technology alumni
Ohio State University Graduate School alumni
People from Ufa
Software engineers
Technology company founders